Astathes straminea is a species of beetle in the family Cerambycidae. It was described by Pascoe in 1857. It is known from Myanmar.

References

S
Beetles described in 1857